The Men's doubles table tennis event at the 2014 Commonwealth Games was held from 31 July to 1 August at the Scotstoun Sports Campus in Glasgow.

Draw

Top Half

Section 1

Section 2

Bottom Half

Section 1

Section 2

Finals

References

Table tennis at the 2014 Commonwealth Games